La Federación Mexicana de Rodeo (FMR) or the Mexican Rodeo Federation  is the governing body of professional American rodeo in Mexico. It is based in Chihuahua, Chihuahua.

History
The FMR was created to support and protect rodeo cowboys and cowgirls who risk their lives to run each of the different disciplines of the sport at high risk.

The organization was founded in 1992 by Diego González Fernández, integrating that year different rodeo associations representing the states of Baja California, Sonora, Chihuahua, Nuevo León and Coahuila, thereby complying with the requirement of the Mexican Sports Confederation. Subsequently, associations from the states of Durango, Zacatecas, Hidalgo, Guanajuato, Aguascalientes, Tamaulipas, and others have joined. To date, there are 19 state associations that make up the FMR.

FMR rodeos include the seven standard events in professional American rodeo: bareback riding, steer wrestling, team roping, saddle bronc riding, tie-down roping, barrel racing, and bull riding.

The top cowboys and cowgirls in each event qualify for the FMR’s year-end Campeonato National de Rodeo (National Rodeo Championship) where the national champions are crowned. This annual event has been held in different cities throughout its history, but has been consistently held in Chihuahua, Chihuahua for the last several years. The National Rodeo Championship was first held in 1993 and ran through 1995, but was not held again until 2000, and it has been held consistently since that year. 

From 2016 to 2019, the Professional Rodeo Cowboys Association (PRCA) co-sanctioned some rodeos with the FMR, and those events counted towards the PRCA’s world standings, as well as the FMR’s national standings. Due to the COVID-19 pandemic, the partnership between the FMR and PRCA was forced to pause for three years, until resuming in 2023.

References

External links
 Official Website

Rodeo organizations
Trade associations based in Mexico